Nu tändas tusen juleljus is a 1972 Anna-Lena Löfgren Christmas album.

Track listing

Sida A
Nu tändas tusen juleljus (Emmy Köhler)
Juletid, välkommen hit
Han håller världen i sin hand
Ett under har skett
Kommen i herdar
I julegranen ljusen brinner
O du saliga, o du heliga (O Sanctissima)
Blott en dag, ett ögonblick i sänder

Side B
Klockorna sång
Ave Maria
Kling klocka, klinge-linge-ling	
En ton från himlen
Ovan där
Dotter Sion, fröjda dig

References

Anna-Lena Löfgren albums
1972 Christmas albums
Christmas albums by Swedish artists
Schlager Christmas albums